Nysten's rule (1811) describes the sequential onset of rigor mortis in the various muscle groups. The basic sequence of the solidifying body begins from the head down the body, in the order:
 Involuntary muscle first: Heart
 Upper eyelids

 Neck
 Jaw
 Face
 Upper extremities
 Muscles of the trunk
 Lower extremities

The rule does not occur in all cases, as described. In particular, it depends on what muscle groups are even claimed before the death - there enters rigor mortis then first one.
It owes its name to the French pediatrician Pierre-Hubert Nysten (1771–1818).

References

  Jason Payne-James,Anthony, Forensic Medicine: Clinical and Pathological Aspects

Signs of death
Forensic pathology